Troxerutin is a flavonol, a type of flavonoid, derived from rutin. It is more accurately a hydroxyethylrutoside. It can be isolated from Sophora japonica, the Japanese pagoda tree.

It is used as a vasoprotective.

Troxerutin has been shown in mice to reverse CNS insulin resistance and reduce reactive oxygen species induced by a high-cholesterol diet.

References 

Quercetin glycosides
Flavonol rutinosides
Phenol ethers